Deh-e Hajji Hoseyn may refer to:
 Deh-e Hajji Hoseyn, Hirmand
 Deh-e Hajji Hoseyn, Zabol